Ciechnowo  (German Technow) is a village in the administrative district of Gmina Sławoborze, within Świdwin County, West Pomeranian Voivodeship, in north-western Poland.

References

Ciechnowo